Čaloševo is a village located in the northeast part of Veles Municipality in North Macedonia. It is estimated to have 197 inhabitants. The population is mostly engaged in agriculture, farming and construction. The young people are engaged in athletics and sports.

Name
Name Čaloševo originates from the Turkish language and it was formerly known as Çalışlar.

History
Nikola Ognjanov ((1830-1835) - 1901) 

Nikola Ognjanov who brought the first change in the village with its trading activities was one of the most merchants at the time that traded in Thessaloniki, Greece. In 1883 he won the award for the best trader in Veles region. Nikola Ognjanov was born in village Čaloševo. Unhappy died in 1901 in the village Čaloševo, was stabbed by a bull which was outraged.

Because Macedonia was under Ottoman rule, the same happened in the small village Čaloševo. The population in the village at that time was predominantly Muslim with less Christian. The village several Christian homes with these surnames (Ognjanovi, Tosevi, Gjoshevi, Ilcovi and Mokrovi). On the 1927 ethnic map of Leonhard Schulze-Jena, the village is written as "Čališlar" and shown as a mixed Turkish and Christian Bulgarian village. The amount of Turks  later reduced, particularly in a period of 1921-1958, they migrated completely to Türkiye. Today the population of Christian faith has about 70 families

Demographics
As of the 2021 census, Čaloševo had 209 residents with the following ethnic composition:
Macedonians 203
Persons for whom data are taken from administrative sources 4
Others 4

According to the 2002 census, the village had a total of 210 inhabitants. Ethnic groups in the village include:
Macedonians 206
Serbs 3
Others 1

References

Villages in Veles Municipality